Eureka is a 1983 psychological drama film directed by Nicolas Roeg, and starring Gene Hackman, Rutger Hauer, Theresa Russell, Mickey Rourke, and Joe Pesci. It follows the life of a Klondike prospector who becomes one of the world's wealthiest men after striking gold in 1925, but, 20 years on, fears that he is being preyed upon by his daughter and her social-climbing husband, as well as a mobster attempting to usurp the Caribbean island he owns. The screenplay is loosely based on the unsolved murder of Sir Harry Oakes in the Bahamas in 1943.

Eureka was filmed in 1982 in England, the United States, Canada, and Jamaica, on a budget of $11 million. It received a theatrical release in England in May 1983, though its distributor, United Artists, temporarily shelved the film from release in the United States, as they were unsure how to properly market it to the public. Furthermore, it was granted an X rating in the United states for its graphic depictions of violence. It was eventually given a limited release in Los Angeles in the fall of 1984. The film was a box-office bomb, and received mixed reviews from critics.

Plot
In 1925 in the Yukon, prospector Jack McCann spends the evening in a remote brothel, where he has a spiritual experience with the madam, Frieda, a clairvoyant who bestows him a mysterious stone. Frieda warns Jack that he will strike gold, but that it will lead him toward a grim fate. The following morning, while prospecting, Jack falls through a glacier into a cache of gold beneath. Jack returns to the brothel—now strangely empty and dilapidated—and witnesses Frieda, lying alone in the parlor, die. Jack's discovery quickly makes him one of the wealthiest men in the world.

Twenty years later in 1945, he lives in luxury on a Caribbean island that he owns, in an estate named Eureka. However, Jack's wealth brings him no peace, as he copes with Helen, his bored, alcoholic wife; Tracy, his headstrong daughter who has married Claude Van Horn, a dissolute, philandering social climber; his paranoid assistant Charles Perkins; and Miami mobsters led by Aurelio D'Amato sent by crime boss Mayakofsky, who wants to acquire Jack's island and build a casino there. Jack's life is entangled with the obsessions of those around him with greed, power, and debauchery against a background of occult symbolism.

Tracy, caught in the midst of her father's hostility toward Claude, eventually decides to break ties with her father. This results in Jack lashing out at both Claude and her, whom he comes to believe want to "steal his soul". Meanwhile, under Mayakofsky's supervision, Aurelio continues to vie for Jack's island, but Jack resists their attempts. One night during a rainstorm, Claude and three of his friends attend a voodoo ritual that descends into a maddening orgy. The same night, Aurelio, along with several of his henchmen—including an associate named Pete—arrive on the island and travel to Eureka. Jack remains defiant against their attempts to strongarm him and take ownership of the island. In response, Pete brutalizes Jack, bludgeoning him in the head with a wrench before meticulously burning him alive with a blowtorch as he lay helpless in his bed, and then decapitating him with a cleaver. The vicious murder is witnessed by Claude, who returns to the house in the midst of it, as well as by Charles, who was sleeping in an adjacent bedroom.

Claude is swiftly apprehended by authorities, who believe him to be Jack's killer, and he is put on trial for murder. After several witnesses give testimony, including a dramatic testimony from Tracy, Claude is ultimately acquitted of Jack's murder due to lack of evidence. His acquittal coincides with the end of the Caribbean War, but the judge notifies him that he will be deported from the island. Claude and Tracy celebrate his freedom with a formal dinner, during which Claude proposes that they sell Eureka and move to France. Tracy responds that she wishes to give the entire island away for free. Claude, after realizing he will only bring Tracy pain, leaves the house and takes a rowboat to his sailboat anchored offshore as Tracy watches in tears. Jack's murder remains unsolved.

Cast

Production

Filming
Eureka was filmed throughout 1982, with principal photography occurring in Florida, Jamaica, and British Columbia, as well as at EMI-Elstree Studios and Twickenham Film Studios in England. The shooting budget was $11 million.

Release
Eureka opened theatrically in London on May 5, 1983. In the United States, the film initially received an X rating from the Motion Picture Association of America for its graphic violence. After being shelved for two years by its distributor, United Artists, who were unsure of how to market the film, Eureka was given a brief limited theatrical release in the United States on October 5, 1984.

Box office
The film was a box-office bomb, grossing a total of $123,572.

Home media
Eureka was released to DVD by MGM Home Entertainment on September 16, 2003, as a Region 1 widescreen DVD, as well as a 2016 Blu-ray release (under license from MGM) by Twilight Time. Masters of Cinema also issued a Blu-ray edition in the United Kingdom.

Legacy
Film critic and film maker Mark Cousins put Eureka in his top-10 favorite films in the Sight & Sound Greatest Films poll 2012 and has called the film a "masterpiece". Director Danny Boyle listed Eureka as one of his top-five favorite films of all time.

The film's title was used by musician Jim O'Rourke for his album Eureka.

References

Further reading

External links

1983 films
1983 drama films
American crime films
American gangster films
American mystery films
American psychological drama films
British crime films
British gangster films
British mystery films
Films à clef
Films directed by Nicolas Roeg
Films set in 1925
Films set in 1945
Films set in the Caribbean
Films set in Yukon
Films shot at EMI-Elstree Studios
Films shot in Vancouver
Films shot in Florida
Films produced by Jeremy Thomas
Films scored by Stanley Myers
Films with screenplays by Paul Mayersberg
Films about mining
Northern (genre) films
Supernatural drama films
Metro-Goldwyn-Mayer films
United Artists films
1980s English-language films
1980s American films
1980s British films

es:Eureka (1983 film)#top